Eva Birnerová (born 14 August 1984) is a Czech former tennis player.

In her career, she won three doubles titles on the WTA Tour, as well as eight singles and 11 doubles titles on the ITF Women's Circuit. On 29 January 2007, she reached her best singles ranking of world No. 59. On 21 May 2012, she peaked at No. 52 in the WTA doubles rankings.

Playing for Czech Republic Fed Cup team, Birnerová has a win–loss record of 0–2.

Career
Birnerová was an all-court player who preferred playing on grass.
On the junior tour, she was the 2002 European Champion and No. 1 in the combined world ranking of 18-U.

In 2006, Birnerová won her first WTA Tour doubles title in Stockholm, alongside Jarmila Gajdošová.
In 2011, she reached her first WTA Tour singles final in Tashkent, losing to top seed Ksenia Pervak in straight sets.

Grand Slam performance timelines

Singles

Doubles

WTA career finals

Singles: 1 (runner-up)

Doubles: 9 (3 titles, 6 runner-ups)

ITF Circuit finals

Singles: 13 (8 titles, 5 runner-ups)

Doubles: 19 (11 titles, 8 runner-ups)

References

External links

 
 
 
 Eva Birnerová Official Website

1984 births
Living people
People from Duchcov
Czech female tennis players
Sportspeople from the Ústí nad Labem Region